Jack Whitehall: Travels with My Father is a travel documentary/road trip comedy television series that debuted on Netflix. The show is presented by comedian Jack Whitehall and his father, Michael Whitehall. The show covers the pair's travels to various places around the world, encountering silly and awkward situations.

The first series consist of six episodes and was released on Netflix on 22 September 2017, and covers the pair's travel to South East Asia on a popular "gap year route", and involves them travelling through Thailand, Vietnam, and Cambodia. The series was renewed for a second series which was filmed in Eastern Europe. The second season premiered on 28 September 2018, and consisted of five episodes.
The third season was filmed in the American west and premiered on 6 September 2019, and only consisted of two episodes. The fourth season was filmed in Australia and premiered on 22 September 2020, and consisted of another two episodes. A fifth season, filmed in the U.K. and consisting of three episodes, was released on 14 September 2021.

Series overview
<onlyinclude>

Episodes

Series 1 (2017)
Series 1 sees Jack and his father, Michael, embark on the trip of a lifetime across South East Asia. Along the way the pair visits Thailand, Cambodia and Vietnam.

Series 2 (2018)
In the second series, Jack and his father, Michael, embark on a road trip across Europe. It is to be a trip of high culture and timeless art, a true rite of passage in the vein of the 18th-century Grand Tours, however, Jack has other plans. Along their way they visit Germany, Hungary, Romania, Moldova, Ukraine and Turkey.

Series 3 (2019)
In the third series, Jack shows his father around the American west in the hope that he will move there with him. However, in usual fashion, Michael tries to take the whole trip over.

Series 4 (2020)
In the fourth series, Jack shows his father around Australia.

: The Final Journey (2021)
In the fifth and final series, Jack shows his father around the United Kingdom; later they reminisce about their favorite moments on the series.

References

External links
 

2017 British television series debuts
2010s British comedy television series
2010s British documentary television series
2010s British travel television series
2020s British comedy television series
2020s British documentary television series
2020s British travel television series
2021 British television series endings
English-language Netflix original programming
Netflix original documentary television series
Television series by Tiger Aspect Productions
Television series by Banijay
Television shows set in Cambodia
Television shows set in Myanmar
Television shows set in Thailand
Television shows set in Vietnam